Studio Misr was a film studio established in Egypt in 1934 by the economist Talaat Harb. Owned and staffed by Egyptians, it was known as 'The Studio of Egypt'. For three decades, it was the leading Egyptian equivalent to Hollywood's major studios.

Studio Misr's first film was Wedad (1936), the first film to star the singer Umm Kulthum. In 1939 Studio Misr made four films, including Determination, out of a total of fifteen Egyptian films. Facing difficulty raising capital in the 1940s, Studio MISR reduced its emphasis on direct film production, increasingly renting out its development, printing and editing facilities to other Arab filmmakers. In 1946, for example, Studio MISR made three films - including Black Market - out of a total of 52 Egyptian films. After a slow deterioration in the 1980s, they were taken over by Karim Gamal El Dine and are now equipped with digital editing rooms and a working photochemical laboratory.

References

1935 establishments in Egypt
Film production companies of Egypt
Mass media companies established in 1935
1935 in film